Acrobasis elyi is a species of snout moth in the genus Acrobasis. It was described by Herbert H. Neunzig in 1970, and is known from Connecticut to Florida in the United States.

There is one generation per year.

The larvae feed on Carya species including Carya tomentosa. The species overwinters in the larval stage.

References

Moths described in 1970
Acrobasis
Moths of North America